Emergent curriculum is a philosophy of teaching and a way of planning a children's curriculum that focuses on being responsive to their interests.  The goal is to create meaningful learning experiences for the children. 

Emergent curriculum can be practiced with children at any grade level. It prioritizes:

 active participation by students
 relationship-building among students
 flexible and adaptable methods  
 inquiry by students
 play-based learning by students

Emergent curriculum is child-initiated, collaborative and responsive to the children's needs. Proponents state that knowledge of the children is the key to success in any emergent curriculum (Cassidy, Mims, Rucker, & Boone, 2003; Crowther, 2005).

Planning an emergent curriculum requires:

 observation
 documentation 
 creative brainstorming
 flexibility 
 patience 

Emergent curriculum starts with the observation of the children for insight into their interests. Additionally, content is influenced by values held for the children's learning by the school, community, family and culture (MachLachlan, 2013). The classroom typically consists of learning centres that expand and facilitate children's learning (Crowther, 2005) and encourage independent learning skills (MachLachlan, 2013).

Teacher as facilitator of learning

Teacher roles 
Teachers who employ emergent curriculum understand that the trajectory of learning happens as a consequence of the children's genuine interest, response, and connection to the subject (Crowther, 2005; Jones & Reynolds, 2011, MachLachlan et al., 2013). In order for this to happen, the teacher must consider their position as a facilitator in the classroom. 

The facilitator role for the teacher involves careful observations of the children and their play as well as flexibility and creativity in order to develop learning opportunities that align with their interests (Cassidy et al., 2003; Crowther, 2005; Jones & Reynolds, 2011; Stacey, 2009a/2011b; Machlachlan et al., 2013; Wein, 2008; Wright, 1997). Carolyn Edwards notes: “The teachers honestly do not know where the group will end up.  Although this openness adds a dimension of difficulty to their work, it also makes it more exciting.” (Edwards, Gandini & Foreman, 1993, pp. 159). Teachers act as researchers who are constantly collecting data, implementing strategies and assessing their outcomes (MachLachlan et al., 2013; Stacey, 2009). Success in implementing emergent curriculum requires that the teacher have a curious disposition about children and their learning (Stacey, 2009).

It is the role of the teacher to be a participant-observer in the children's play (Wright, 1997). These programs give power to children's voices and are consistently scaffolding their learning (Stacey, 2009). The teacher is constantly going through the process of observing and documenting, planning learning experiences, implementing plans, documenting and beginning the cycle again (Crowther, 2005; MachLachlan et al., 2013; Stacey, 2009a/ 2011b). 

In these emergent curriculum settings, teachers will often implement some educational initiatives  For example, learning is viewed as a process-oriented experience where children are praised for their effort rather than the final product (Stacey, 2011; Wright, 1997). Additionally, children in these settings are given options and choice about how they wish to spend their time, choose their activities and utilize learning centres  (Stacey, 2009). This is believed to develop curiosity, initiative, self-direction and persistence (MachLachlan et al., 2013).

Changes in curriculum 
Because the emergent curriculum is continually changing, developing and growing, teachers need to allot time to reflect on their observations and strategies implemented (Stacey 2009a/2011b). One way to engage in reflection is through discussion with colleagues (Stacey, 2009). Reflection allows the teacher to think about what happens next in the child's learning, how to proceed, and what to look for in future observations (Stacey, 2011). 

Teachers must be aware of their own knowledge and where it is lacking.  This  type of environment can lead to investigations in an unlimited number of directions (Crowther, 2005). Teachers are also individuals with interests and passions, and sharing these with the class can provide a great opportunity to model knowledge and enthusiasm (MachLachlan et al., 2013).

Emergent curriculum programs are meant to be culturally responsive and inclusive in nature, so that all children are able to work at their own pace (Crowther, 2005). To help facilitate this, teachers follow the children's lead, expand on their interests, provide meaningful and developmentally appropriate materials, and promote independent learning skills (Crowther, 2005; Stacey, 2009; Wien, 2008).

Planning an emergent curriculum

Activities 

 Once teachers see an interest “emerging” among their students, they brainstorm ways to study the topic in depth. 
 From these observations and brainstorming, the teacher comes up with activities that complement and build upon the emerging interest, with opportunities for play at multiple ability levels. 
 Once activities have been implemented, the teacher observes the children's use of them, constantly modifying them to accommodate increasing interest or change in direction of the learning. 
 The teacher documents these observations and reflects on the effectiveness of the activities. 

Then the process begins again. The teacher may be at different levels of this planning cycle for multiple activities or learning outcomes at once (Cassidy et al., 2003; Crowther, 2005; Jones & Reynolds, 2011; Stacey, 2009a/2011b; Machlachlan et al., 2013; Wein, 2008; Wright, 1997).

Learning plans 
In emergent curriculum settings, learning plans are often more of a loose outline. This because success in the program often generates spontaneous deterrence by students to plans to support engagement (MachLachlan et al., 2013; Stacey, 2009). 

Webbing is often used for planning because of its flexible nature.  A web doesn't show everything that will be learned, it shows many things that could be learned as well as connections to curriculum expectations (MachLachlan et al., 2013).  However, it is important to use the web as a tool to open the teacher to possibilities not a “plan.”  Teachers brainstorm many possibilities for study sparked from the particular interest, not as a plan but more as a ‘road map’ as one teacher put it:
To get a plan, we chose an idea and brainstormed ways that children could play it – hands-on activities we could provide.  Putting all the activities on a web gives you a road map full of possible journeys.  (Jones p. 129)

An idea for a curriculum topic may be sparked by things, people, events in the environment, issues that arise in the classroom, etc. (MachLachlan et al., 2013; Stacey, 2009).  

For instance, a teacher may overhear a group of students having a discussion about insects that leads to the class sitting down and coming up with a web topic that explores all the possible directions the class could go in to learn about insects.  Ideas may also be sparked by offering experiences like a walk in the neighborhood, visiting local businesses, or reading books.

Classrooms 
For emergent curriculum, classrooms are often organized into core curriculum areas, where activities may have a curricular theme while following student interest (Crowther, 2005). 

For example, while students are demonstrating an interest in restaurants, the literacy area may allow opportunity to write customer orders while the math area may have plastic money for the children to experiment with. 

These centres are meant to encourage active participation with the content (Crowther, 2005). In emergent curriculum settings, there should be opportunity to:

 involve all the senses 
 challenge creativity 
 hear and use oral and written language
 explore art media
 practice solving interpersonal problems
 conduct investigations and ask questions
 explore and order material
 acquire various physical skills (Crowther, 2005; MachLachlan et al., 2013; Wright, 1997).

Teachers see learning as a process through which children first engage in exploration and physical action which then leads to mastery of skills (MachLachlan et al., 2013). Some researchers argue that this method of planning is more effective for learning because it relies on the intrinsic motivation of students, therefore facilitating increased engagement with the material (Stacey, 2011). However, because of this, it is normal to have multiple children or groups interested in completely different content (Stacey 2009a/2011b). This makes documentation and preparation very important.

Emergent learning classrooms still maintain much of the structure of a regular classroom. It is important for children to still experience schedule and organization. Therefore, in these classrooms you will often still find large and small group instructional times, but the implementation of them is more flexible (Stacey 2009a/2011b).

The learning environment 
Because emergent curriculum programs emphasize independence and persistence in their programs, learning centres are typically set up in very particular ways. 

 Items and materials that are stored are easily accessible to the children visually and physically. 
 Things are usually labeled with words and pictures to assist children, and clear storage containers are preferred (Crowther, 2005; Jones & Reynolds, 2011; Stacey, 2011).

Students can be seen working in a variety of social environments. The learning environment should offer opportunities to work in groups of all different sizes, as well as individually (Crowther, 2005). Students are also given opportunities to experience materials in different ways, such as quiet reading corners and dramatic play areas (Stacey, 2011)

"Reggio Emilia" schools are an example of early childhood services that use an emergent approach.

Documentation 
Documentation is a very important and very time-consuming aspect of this type of programming (Stacey, 2011). Because teachers are held accountable to parents, licensing boards and colleagues, it is necessary that thorough documentation is kept (Crowther, 2005; Stacey, 2009).

Documentation for observation and assessment 
Because of the reliance on observational methods to inform planning and assessment, it is crucial for teachers to have strategies in place to expedite the process. Some examples of tools used by teachers are:

 sticky notes
 observation baskets around the room to collect small anecdotal notes
 file folder systems for each student or area of the classroom
 clipboards 
 digital recorders
 photography
 video recording
 audio recording 

These methods allow learning to become visually represented and are good for reflection and validation of methods (Stacey, 2009).

These strategies can be effective in ensuring proper assessment procedures (Cassidy et al., 2003). The use of student portfolios can be a way to assess learning and share it with parents/guardians (Stacey 2009a/2011b). Additionally, the use of pre populated data collection sheets can be helpful to keep good records (Stacey, 2011)

Documentation for planning 
Use of webs and other graphic organizers can be a good way to demonstrate how the students are being exposed to curriculum expectations and brainstorm related ideas (MachLachlan et al., 2013; Stacey, 2009). Keeping track of interest paths that develop in the classroom can help teachers demonstrate the process of learning, revise and reflect on it and develop future directions (Stacey, 2009).

Each learning or interest centre in the classroom usually has its own plan, as well as activities facilitated by the teacher (Stacey, 2011).

Documentation for Students 
Emergent curriculum involved students being collaborative partners in their learning (Stacey, 2009), therefore it is important to incorporate children in displaying and documenting their learning (Stacey, 2009; Wright, 1997). Some strategies teachers can use for this are:

 audio and visual recordings
 samples of children's work
 photos
 learning logs
 display boards (Stacey, 2009). 

These approaches can help students develop pride in their work, show off skills to parents/guardians, and display their interests (Crowther, 2005). These processes are not static, rather these projects grow as learning develops (Crowther, 2005).

References 
Booth, Cleta. “The Fiber Project: One Teacher’s Adventure Toward Emergent Curriculum”.  Early Childhood Education p. 66-71.
Cassidy, D., Mims, S., Rucker, L., & Boone, S. (2003). Emergent curriculum and kindergarten readiness. Childhood Education, 79(4), 194–199. doi: 10.1080/00094056.2003.10521192. 
Crowther, I. (2005). Introduction to early childhood education: A Canadian perspective. Toronto: Thomson Nelson.
Edwards, Carolyn. Gandini, Lella, Forman, George.  The Hundred Languages of Children: The Reggio Emilia Approach to Early Childhood Education. New Jersey: Ablex Publishing Corp. 1993. 
Gonzalez-Mena, Janet (2011). Foundations of Early Childhood Education (Fifth Edition). New York: McGraw-Hi 
Hart, Linda. “The Dance of Emergent Curriculum”. Copyright© 2003 by the Canadian Child Care Federation. All rights reserved. 201-383 Parkdale Ave, Ottawa, ON K1Y 4R4 1-800-858-1412
Jones, Elizabeth. & Nimmo, John.  Emergent Curriculum. Washington DC: NAEYC 1994.
Jones, Elizabeth., Evans, Kathleen.,& Stritzel, Kay.  The Lively Kindergarten: Emergent Curriculum in Action. Washington DC: NAEYC. 2001.
Jones, E. & Reynold, G. (2011).The play's the thing: Teachers role in children's play (2nd Ed.). Ryan, S. (Ed.). New York: Teachers College Press.
MachLachlan, C., Fleer, M. & Edwards, S. (2013). Early childhood curriculum: Planning, assessment and implementation (2nd Ed.). Cambridge: Cambridge University Press. 
Stacey, S. (2009a). Emergent curriculum in early education settings: From theory to practice. St. Paul: Redleaf Press. 
Stacey, S. (2011b). The unscripted classroom: Emergent curriculum in action. St.Paul: Redleaf Press
Wein, C. (Eds.). (2008). Emergent curriculum in the primary classroom: Interpreting the Reggio Emilia approach in schools. New York: Teachers College Press, Washington: National Association for the Education of Young Children. 
Wright, S. (1997). Learning how to learn the arts as core in emergent curriculum. Childhood Education, 73(6), 361–365. doi: 10.1080/00094056.1997.10521140.

Curricula
Philosophy of education
Early childhood education